The 43rd G7 summit was held on 26–27 May 2017 in Taormina (ME), Sicily, Italy. In March 2014, the G7 declared that a meaningful discussion was currently not possible with Russia in the context of the G8. Since then, meetings have continued within the G7 process.

It was the first time since 1987 that the G7 summit held in Italy was not hosted by Silvio Berlusconi. The participation of Angela Merkel and Theresa May made it the first time two G7 female leaders were principals in the G7 summit.

The choice of Taormina as the headquarters of the G7 was announced by the then Prime Minister Matteo Renzi on 4 July 2016. The summit was initially scheduled to take place in Florence. Among  the reasons for the change of choice, Renzi cited the words of an international leader at a previous summit that with a joke had highlighted his prejudice against Sicily pointing out as the land of the Mafia and claimed that those words had convinced him to fix the G7 in Sicily.

Leaders at the summit

The attendees include the leaders of the seven G7 member states as well as representatives of the European Union. The President of the European Commission has been a permanently welcome participant at all meetings and decision-making since 1981.

The 43rd G7 summit was the first summit for British Prime Minister Theresa May, French President Emmanuel Macron, and U.S. President Donald Trump. It was also the first and only summit for Italian Prime Minister Paolo Gentiloni.

Participants

Agenda
The G7 leaders emphasized common endeavours: to end the Syrian crisis, to fulfill the UN mission in Libya and reducing the presence of ISIS, ISIL and Da'esh in Syria and Iraq. North Korea was urged to comply with UN resolutions, Russian responsibility was stressed for the Ukraine conflict. Supporting economic activity and ensuring price stability was demanded while inequalities in trade and gender were called to be challenged. It was agreed to help countries in creating conditions that address the drivers of migration: ending hunger, increasing competitiveness and advancing global health security.

Gallery of participating leaders

Invited guests

International organizations

See also
G8

References

External links

Official Website

2017 conferences
2017 in international relations
21st-century diplomatic conferences (Global)
Diplomatic conferences in Italy
2017
May 2017 events in Italy
Taormina